Miami is an unincorporated community in Colfax County, New Mexico, United States.

Miami lies on State Road 21 and is between Springer and Sunny Side. The community includes approximately six homes and eight ranches.

Miami was named by its founders after Miami, Ohio and was originally called Miami Ranch.  Miami Lake, a private man-made reservoir, located just off State Road 21, six miles (10 km) due west of the community, was part of the Miami Project of the Farmers Development Company which purchased  in the area in 1906.

References

Further reading
 Stanley, Francis (1964) The Miami, New Mexico Story Pep, Texas

External links 
Miami, New Mexico via Google Maps

Unincorporated communities in Colfax County, New Mexico
Unincorporated communities in New Mexico